Allen Bruce Rycroft (born September 1, 1950) is a Canadian former professional ice hockey player.

During the 1972–73 season, Rycroft played seven games in the World Hockey Association with the Cleveland Crusaders.

References

External links

1950 births
Calgary Centennials players
Canadian ice hockey forwards
Cleveland Crusaders players
Fort Wayne Komets players
Ice hockey people from Alberta
Jacksonville Barons players
Living people
Macon Whoopees (SHL) players
Seattle Totems (WHL) players
Syracuse Blazers players
Syracuse Eagles players